Raghunatha Reddy is an Indian actor from Andhra Pradesh. He acted in more than 370 films. Apart from Telugu, he also acted in Tamil, Hindi and Bhojpuri films. He appears in Telugu TV serials also.

Early life
He was born in Vijayawada to the couple Krishna Reddy and Samrajyamma.
He is married to Annapoorna. They have three kids, Sudha Lakshmi, Aruna and Sudhakar Reddy.

Career
He has had stage experience from 1966 to 1996. He made his debut in films with the Sobhan Babu-starrer Sarpa Yagam in 1991, produced by D. Ramanaidu and directed by Paruchuri Brothers.

Filmography

References

External links

Telugu male actors
Living people
Male actors in Telugu cinema
Indian male film actors
Male actors from Hyderabad, India
Male actors in Telugu television
Indian male television actors
20th-century Indian male actors
21st-century Indian male actors
Year of birth missing (living people)